Watcher (stylized as WATCHER) is a 2019 South Korean television series starring Han Suk-kyu, Seo Kang-joon, and Kim Hyun-joo. It aired on OCN every Saturday and Sunday at 22:20 (KST) from July 6 to August 25, 2019.

Synopsis
“Watcher” is a 2019 Korean drama directed by Ahn Gil Ho.

A brutal murder committed 15 years ago turned three lives upside down. A decade and a half later, the trio – brought together by fate – goes on the hunt for answers.

Kim Young Goon (Seo Kang Joon), a police officer who may be considered aloof and uncaring, joins an investigation unit headed by hardened long-time cop Do Chi Gwang (Han Suk Kyu). The nightmarish events 15 years ago still haunt Kim Young Goon – but his memories also provide no shortage of motivation.

Do Chi Gwang, meanwhile, has led a quest to uncover widespread corruption as part of his unswerving pursuit of justice – a quest that has won him few friends in the police force.

They are eventually joined by Han Tae Joo (Kim Hyun Joo), a former prosecutor who has become a lawyer.

Will the trio unearth the truth about the fateful event that has shaped their destiny? And what dark secrets will they uncover along their way?

Cast

Main
 Han Suk-kyu as Do Chi-kwang
A detective who has caught many criminals during his career. He hates corruption within the police and becomes leader of the internal affairs investigation team to find the truth about a particular incident.
 Seo Kang-joon as Kim Yeong Goon
A police officer who joins Do Chi-kwang's team after they become involved in the same incident.
 Kim Hyun-joo as Han Tae-joo
A former prosecutor turned lawyer after she got involved too deep while working on a case and almost died. She starts working with Do Chi-kwang and Kim Yeong Goon.

Supporting
 Heo Sung-tae as Jang Hae-ryong
Head of the Police Investigation Department, he is often in conflict with Do Chi-kwang.
 Park Joo-hee as Jo Soo-yeon
With a degree in Chemistry, she became part of the Scientific Investigation Team. After she makes a mistake, however, she decides to quit to join the internal affairs investigation team.
 Joo Jin-mo as Park Jin-woo
Deputy Commissioner of police force.
 Kim Soo-jin as Yeom Dong-sook
Commissioner of police force.
 Lee Joong-ok as Jae Shik's friend

Production
The series is directed by Ahn Gil-ho (Stranger, Memories of the Alhambra).

Original soundtrack

Part 1

Part 2

Part 3

Part 4

Ratings

References

External links
  
 
 
 Watcher on Viki

OCN television dramas
Korean-language television shows
South Korean thriller television series
2019 South Korean television series debuts
2019 South Korean television series endings
Television series by Studio Dragon